Michelle Borth is an American actress who has portrayed characters on The Forgotten and the HBO series Tell Me You Love Me. Borth played Catherine Rollins on the CBS crime-drama Hawaii Five-0.

Early life and education
Borth was born and grew up in New York City. Her mother is of Italian origin, and owns a home improvement business. She has two younger brothers. She aspired to become a gymnast but later discovered acting at a camp. She matriculated at Pace University, receiving a Bachelor of Fine Arts in Theater and Art History in 2001.

Career
Borth's previous credits include the films Wonderland, Trespassers, The Sisterhood, Silent Warnings, Rampage: The Hillside Strangler Murders, and Komodo vs. Cobra; and guest appearances on the Supernatural episode "What Is and What Should Never Be" and the Law & Order: SVU episode "Trade". She also appeared in Burger King's "Lunch Break" advertising campaign. She was also featured in John Mayer's "Bigger Than My Body" video.

In 2008, she wrapped the independent film TiMER with Emma Caulfield and Desmond Harrington, and appeared in the Endgame Productions comedy film, A Good Old Fashioned Orgy with Leslie Bibb, Lake Bell, and Jason Sudeikis. In 2009, she was a cast member of ABC's The Forgotten, appearing in 17 episodes, including part of the 2010 season. In 2010, she also guest starred on the TNT TV series Dark Blue double-episode season finale.
 
In 2010 Borth appeared in the 2010 version of Hawaii Five-0 on CBS where she appeared as on and off Steve McGarrett's girlfriend, Lt. Catherine Rollins, a Navy Lieutenant. On March 26, 2012, CBS announced that Borth would become a cast regular on Hawaii Five-0 for seasons 3 & 4. On March 27, 2014, it was announced that she would not be returning for the fifth season, with the reason for her departure left unknown. However, she would return in the show's 5th-season finale as a guest star. In July 2015 it was announced that Borth would have a recurring role in the first three episodes of the show’s 6th season. On September 8, 2016 it was announced that Borth would be returning as a guest for the show's 150th episode. On March 19 2018, it was announced that Borth would once again be returning to the series as a guest star for the eighth season's twentieth episode.

Borth starred as Canadian Forces surgeon Major Rebecca Gordon on Global's 2011 Canadian drama television series Combat Hospital, which was cancelled after its first season. She appears in the 2019 film Shazam! playing the adult version of Mary Bromfield.

Filmography

Film

Television

References

General

External links
 

21st-century American actresses
Actresses from New York City
American people of Italian descent
American television actresses
American film actresses
Living people
Pace University alumni
Year of birth missing (living people)